The Hull Seahawks are an ice hockey team based in Kingston upon Hull and their home ice is the Hull Arena. They compete in the NIHL National Division.

Formation
The Hull Pirates were formed when the Hull Stingrays went into liquidation in June 2015. The Stingrays' place in the Elite Ice Hockey League was taken by Manchester Storm.

On Friday 3 July 2015, Shane Smith, a 43-year-old Rotherham-based businessman, held a press day at the Hull Arena to announce the formation of the Hull Pirates and that they had been accepted into the EPIHL.

It was also announced that former Hull Stingrays' forward Dominic Osman would become a player-coach and part-owner of Hull Pirates.

A fans' forum was held on 15 July 2015 with the unveiling of the club's logo. The Pirates had six weeks to put together a team in time for the upcoming league campaign.

In their first season as a club, Hull Pirates achieved a 9th-place finish in the EPIHL.

For the 2016–17 season, the Pirates announced the re-signings of forwards Nathan Salem and Lee Bonner as well as Jamie Chilcott and Jonathan Kirk, who both play in defence. Goalie Ashley Smith became the club's latest signing on 20 March 2016.

Following the culmination of the 2016–17 season and the collapse of the EPIHL, the Hull Pirates were left with no choice and announced their intention to join the National Ice Hockey League.

The team did not playing in the 2021–22 season as their rink was not available in time for the start of the season.

Ahead of the 2022–23 season, it was announced that due diligence of a new ownership group (IMJ Group) had been completed  and the Hull Seahawks would be competing in the NIHL National Division in place of the Pirates. IMJ consists of Ian Mowfirth, Joe Lamplough and former Pirates, Stingrays and Kingston forward Matty Davies.  Davies will also take up the roles of General Manager and Player-Coach.

Club roster 2022–23
(*) Denotes a Non-British Trained player (Import)

2022–23 Outgoing

Season-by-season record

Coaching records

 Note: Head coaching records are for regular season results only and does not include cup competitions, playoffs or exhibition games*

JASON HEWITT COMBINED RECORD: 92-34-8

References

Ice hockey teams in England
Ice hockey clubs established in 2015
Sport in Kingston upon Hull
EPIHL teams
2015 establishments in England